Golshan Rural District is a rural district (dehestan) in the Central District of Tabas County, South Khorasan Province, Iran. At the 2006 census, its population was 4,002, in 988 families.  The rural district has 18 villages.

References 

Rural Districts of South Khorasan Province
Tabas County